Mariah May Mead (born 4 August 1998) is an English professional wrestler, model and actress, currently signed to World Wonder Ring Stardom, where she is a member of Club Venus. She goes by the ring name “The Glamour” Mariah May and is best known for her work with various independent promotions including Revolution Pro Wrestling, having won multiple championships in the country.

Professional wrestling career

Early career (2018–2020) 
Before officially stepping into the ring, Mariah began her career as a ring announcer where she would perform on multiple shows over the course of 2018.

On 2 February 2019, she would make her in-ring debut as a professional wrestler facing NXT UK's Nina Samuels. While initially unsuccessful in her efforts, the two would have a series of matches crossing over multiple promotions. Their third and final match, taking place at South West Wrestling's Wrestleversary, ultimately saw the Glamour overcome her adversary and score a victory against Samuels.

As a last minute replacement, Mariah would appear at Progress Wrestling's Chapter 89 show on 26 May 2019 and mark her first appearance with the promotion. With the show playing to an 80s theme, she would perform one time under the fitness instructor-inspired Mariah Eagan persona.

After only a brief few matches, in June 2019, Mariah would be selected to attend and partake in a 3-day WWE tryout at the brand new UK WWE Performance Center, where she received coaching from William Regal, Sarah Stock, and others.

Independent promotions (2020–2022) 
On 29 February 2020, Mariah would compete against five other opponents at day two of United Wrestling UK's "I Can Do This All Day" event. In front of a sold out crowd she would win the main event and earn her first championship in professional wrestling.

The Glamour returned to wrestling following the lockdowns of the COVID-19 pandemic on 26 June 2021. During the time away, Mariah would form a tag team with fellow independent wrestler Zoe Lucas, with the two collectively known as the Dream Dollz. The team would have their first match together at TNT Extreme Wrestling.

This partnership would only grow deeper as seen at Revolution Pro Wrestling's "Live from the Cockpit 51" event. After Gisele Shaw defeated Zoe Lucas to reclaim the vacated Revolution Pro Wrestling's Undisputed Women's Championship, Mariah May would take to the ring and ambush the new champion during a post-match interview, cementing her arrival on 4 July 2021. A rivalry would quickly form as The Glamour challenged Gisele for her newly-won title on July 18, 2021. While unable to walk away with the gold, this feud would continue into the promotion's Queen of the Ring tournament later that month. Mariah, along with Shaun Jackson and Kenneth Halfpenny, would assist Zoe Lucas in defeating Gisele Shaw to win the crown and the right to call herself Revolution Pro Wrestling's Queen of the Ring. Shortly after, the newly-dubbed Princess of Revolution Pro Wrestling would find herself up against the duo of Gisele Shaw and Hyan throughout the summer. These bouts culminated in Mariah once again challenging Gisele for the championship on 21 August 2021 at Rev Pro's 9-year Anniversary Show in Manchester.

During the remainder of 2021, Mariah would continue to find success across multiple independent promotions where she would not only successfully defend her first championship but go on to continue and win two more.

Entering 2022, Mariah would find solo success at Revolution Pro Wrestling, picking up victories in singles matches against Chantal Jordan and Laura Di Matteo.

At Ultimate Pro Wrestling's 7-year anniversary show on 30 January, the Glamour would interfere in the main event, deciding its outcome, and being awarded her forth simultaneous title, the Big League Wrestling Women's Championship.

The following month Mariah would begin, for the first time, a series of appearances in the United States; beginning with a meet and greet at New Jersey's Garden State Trading Card Show where she appeared alongside other wrestlers such as AJ Lee, Kaitlyn (wrestler), Barbi Hayden, Gisele Shaw, Harley Cameron, and more. She would make her American in-ring debut on 26 March 2022 at Battleground Championship Wrestling's "When Worlds Collide", defeating Lady Frost in Philadelphia's 2300 Arena. The next night she would appear on Combat Zone Wrestling's "All Night Long" show, where she would compete again before travelling to Dallas. Over the next three days, beginning on 31 March she would make consecutive appearances at WrestleCon while also having matches at both Texas Style Wrestling on 1 April 2022 and New Texas Pro Wrestling's "Cowboys from Hell" event, challenging for the latter's Women's Championship against Raychell Rose on 2 April 2022.

Upon returning to the UK, Mariah would travel across Europe over the following months and wrestle for promotions in both Germany and Italy during April and May respectively.

On 9 August 2022, Mariah May and Harley Cameron would unite and announce the beginning of their new tag team titled Siren's Fury.

In what would be dubbed the Dreamhouse Deathmatch, Mariah faced off with Harley Hudson, at Sovereign Pro Wrestling's premiere event First Reign on 1 October 2022, in a match with only one rule:  if it's pink, it's legal.

Following this match Mariah would travel to Pakistan where over the next week she would be part of a media tour, promoting Ring of Pakistan and visiting survivors of the 2022 Pakistan floods.

World Wonder Ring Stardom (2022–present) 
At Stardom's Dream Queendom 2, Mariah May would make her debut in Japan accompanying Mina Shirakawa to the ring, alongside a returning Xia Brookside. Mina and Unagi Sayaka representing Cosmic Angels would take on Donna Del Mondo's Mai Sakurai and Thekla in a tag team contest. Following the match, a victorious Shirakawa would both verbally and physically confront Sayaka and announce the formation of her own trio featuring herself, Mariah, and Xia with the three to be known as Club Venus. This newly formed team will take place in Stardom's Triangle Derby I, set to begin on 3 January 2023, as part of the Red Triangle block.

Other media

Outside of professional wrestling, Mariah is also a professional model and has worked with WWE Shop as well as UK fashion brands Misspap, Miss Bardot and more.

On 16 January 2017, Mariah launched her YouTube channel featuring a look into her world of wrestling, fashion, gaming, and fitness.

On 14 June 2020, Mariah launched her Twitch channel where she live streams, chats, and plays games with her community known as House May.

In October 2021, Mariah joined the cast of ITV2’s wrestling comedy series Deep Heat taking on the role of Roxy. The six-part sitcom premiered on 28 March 2022.

Mariah May would take to Canada in July 2022 where she'd model at Calgary's Cowboys Music Festival 2022 as well as for Freddy by Livify Clothing. Later that month she would be cast as the role of "First Smiler" in the Faithful Films production Granny DJ.

Championships and accomplishments

 United Wrestling UK
 United Wrestling UK Championship (1 time)
 Slammasters Wrestling
 Slammasters Women’s Championship (1 time)
 Apex Pro Wrestling
 Apex Women’s Championship (1 time)
 Ultimate Pro Wrestling UK
 Big League Wrestling Women’s Championship (1 time)

References

External links
 
 Cagematch.net profile

1998 births
Living people
English female professional wrestlers